Vladimír Kos (31 March 1936 – 17 September 2017) was a Czech football player.

During his club career he played for ČKD Praha. He was part of the second-placed team at the 1962 FIFA World Cup, but did not win any caps for Czechoslovakia.

References 

1940 births
2017 deaths
Czech footballers
Czechoslovak footballers
1962 FIFA World Cup players
Bohemians 1905 players
AC Sparta Prague players
Association football midfielders